Popovo field is a polje (karstic field) in Bosnia and Herzegovina, located in a southernmost region of the country, near the Adriatic coast.

Popovo polje is one of the largest polje (karstic plains) in Bosnia and Herzegovina and the world, famous for its karstic phenomenons and features, and particularly the Trebišnjica river, which flows through the polje as the largest sinking river (also losing stream, or influent stream) in the world, as well as the Vjetrenica cave system, located to the west/south-western parts of the valley.

History
The Nikolić noble family and Sanković noble family held Popovo polje in the late Middle Ages. The Vojnović noble family hailed from Popovo polje. The Zavala Monastery was first mentioned in the 16th century. At the end of Ottoman rule in Herzegovina, the Muslibegović family had properties in Popovo polje. The Zavala Monastery is located here.

Monuments

Zavala and Vjetrenica
Located in Popovo Polje in Ravno municipality, village Zavala with its old architecture and stone masonry, together with Vjetrenica cave, constitute the natural and architectural ensemble which is in the process of being protected as National Monument of Bosnia and Herzegovina, and it is already placed on UNESCO Tentative List.

The cave has a rich variety of fauna, with a high rate of endemism.  The cave garnered worldwide fame in geological, biological and environmental communities for its imperiled and uncertain future, caused by unprofessional management lacking any expertise, and uncertain status at state and especially local level. Despite setbacks, the government of Bosnia and Herzegovina, although creepingly slowly, nominated Vjeternica (with village Zavala) to UNESCO Tentative List clearly expressing intention to protect the cave and its biodiversity and eventually inscribe it with UNESCO.

Demographics
Some 300 people live in the villages located in the field.

See also 
 List of karst polje in Bosnia and Herzegovina
 Zavala Monastery
 Vjetrenica
 Trebišnjica
 Trebinje
 Viduzia

References

Sources

External links 

 
Karst fields of Bosnia and Herzegovina
Geology of Bosnia and Herzegovina
Dinaric Alps
Trebinje
Ravno, Bosnia and Herzegovina
Lower Horizons Hydroelectric Power Stations System
Trebišnjica
Trebišnjica river damming and regulation controversy